The Social Democrats have always had a large strength in Næstved Municipality. In all the general and municipal elections since the 2007 municipal reform, they had become the largest party and held the mayor's position in the municipality. A change of the party holding the mayor's position was also not expected for this election. 

In the election result, the Social Democrats would once again become the largest party, and would keep the 13 seats they won in 2017. The red bloc parties won 17 of the 31 seats, which made it likely that Carsten Rasmussen would win a third term. This would mean that the party could celebrate 106 years of rule in 2025.. It was eventually confirmed that a third term had been secured.

Electoral system
For elections to Danish municipalities, a number varying from 9 to 31 are chosen to be elected to the municipal council. The seats are then allocated using the D'Hondt method and a closed list proportional representation.
Næstved Municipality had 31 seats in 2021

Unlike in Danish General Elections, in elections to municipal councils, electoral alliances are allowed.

Electoral alliances  

Electoral Alliance 1

Electoral Alliance 2

Electoral Alliance 3

Results

Notes

References 

Næstved